Horace is an unincorporated community in Clay Township, Decatur County, Indiana.

History
Horace was originally called Wyncoop, and under the latter name was platted in 1881 by James Wyncoop.

A post office was established at Horace in 1881, and remained in operation until it was discontinued in 1929.

Geography

References

Unincorporated communities in Decatur County, Indiana
Unincorporated communities in Indiana